The Guangxi Army was an army raised by the Qing dynasty (China) to fight in the Sino-French War during the Tonkin Campaign.

References

Military history of Guangxi
Sino-French War
Disbanded armies
Military units and formations of the Qing dynasty